Noresund is a small village in Krødsherad  in the county of Buskerud, Norway.

Noresund is located on Lake Krøderen. Highway 7 (Riksvei 7) passes through  the village.  Norefjell Ski Area  is located 3 kilometers northwest of Noresund. The population of Noresund is 331 (2006).

Noresund is perhaps best known for with association with the Krødsherad Rectory Natural Monument (Krødsherad prestegård naturminne). This is the site of the oak tree known as The Old Master. This tree was made famous by the poetry of clergyman and poet Jørgen Moe. In 1853 Moe became a resident chaplain in Sigdal and  Krødsherad, a position he held for ten years. At Noresund he found inspiration for one of his most famous poems,  "The Old Master" (den gamle Mester).

The name
The first element is the name of the farm Nore (Norse Nórar), the last element is sund n 'sound, strait'. The name of the farm is the plural of nór n 'narrow strait' - so the meaning of the name Noresund is 'strait-strait'. The actual strait divides Lake Krøderen in two parts (Upper K. and Lower K.). The farm Nore has also given name to the mountain Norefjell.

References

External links
Den gamle Mester

Villages in Buskerud